Grey Glacier is a glacier in the Southern Patagonian Ice Field, just west of the Cordillera del Paine. It flows southward into the lake of  the same name. Before dividing in two at its front end, the glacier is 6 kilometers wide and over 30 meters high. In November 2017 a large iceberg broke off the glacier.



Surroundings

The glacier is at the south end of the Southern Patagonia Ice Field. The surface of the lake can be seen when following the big circuit of Paine Mountain Range at John Garner Pass. There is another view of the glacier from the south shore of the lake where the glacier can be seen in the background, with fragments of ice floating close to the shore. It is located to the west side of the Torres del Paine National Park.

Gallery

See also
List of glaciers

References

External links
 
 Grey Glacier at the NASA Earth Observatory
 See details and pictures of the Navigation to the Grey Glacier.

Glaciers of Magallanes Region
Torres del Paine National Park